Clytoctantes is a South American genus of passerine birds in the antbird family, Thamnophilidae. Males are grey or black and females are mainly rufous. The stubby, hefty bill has a distinctly upcurved lower mandible and a straight culmen (a large version of the bills of the recurvebills), which possibly is a modification for opening bamboo stems in their search for insects. The two species were feared to be extinct or nearly so, until both were rediscovered in 2004.

Species
 Recurve-billed bushbird (Clytoctantes alixii) 
 Rondônia bushbird (Clytoctantes atrogularis)

The name "bushbird" is shared with the rather similar, but smaller-billed black bushbird from the monotypic genus Neoctantes.

 
Bushbirds
Bird genera
Taxonomy articles created by Polbot